Abkenar (also Romanized as Ābkenār; also known as Āb-i-Kinār and Ab-kinar) is a village in Chahar Farizeh Rural District, in the Central District of Bandar-e Anzali County, Gilan Province, Iran. At the 2006 census, its population was 2,970, in 979 families.

References 

Populated places in Bandar-e Anzali County